Prorella tremorata is a moth in the family Geometridae first described by James Halliday McDunnough in 1949. It is found in the US states of California and Nevada.

The wingspan is about 16 mm. The forewings are light ocherous with darker costal blotches. The hindwings are somewhat paler in color with a prominent dark discal streak and an irregular postmedian line. Adults have been recorded on wing in February, April and October.

References

Moths described in 1949
Eupitheciini